Coimbra District (or ) is located in the Centro Region, Portugal. The district capital is the city of Coimbra.

Municipalities
The district is composed by 17 municipalities:

 Arganil
 Cantanhede
 Coimbra
 Condeixa-a-Nova
 Figueira da Foz
 Góis
 Lousã
 Mira
 Miranda do Corvo
 Montemor-o-Velho
 Oliveira do Hospital
 Pampilhosa da Serra
 Penacova
 Penela
 Soure
 Tábua
 Vila Nova de Poiares
All 17 municipalities is divided into 155 parishes or freguesias.

Summary of votes and seats won 1976-2022

|- class="unsortable"
!rowspan=2|Parties!!%!!S!!%!!S!!%!!S!!%!!S!!%!!S!!%!!S!!%!!S!!%!!S!!%!!S!!%!!S!!%!!S!!%!!S!!%!!S!!%!!S!!%!!S!!%!!S
|- class="unsortable" align="center"
!colspan=2 | 1976
!colspan=2 | 1979
!colspan=2 | 1980
!colspan=2 | 1983
!colspan=2 | 1985
!colspan=2 | 1987
!colspan=2 | 1991
!colspan=2 | 1995
!colspan=2 | 1999
!colspan=2 | 2002
!colspan=2 | 2005
!colspan=2 | 2009
!colspan=2 | 2011
!colspan=2 | 2015
!colspan=2 | 2019
!colspan=2 | 2022
|-

| align="left"| PS || style="background:#FF66FF;"|40.9 || style="background:#FF66FF;"|6 || 35.1 || 5 || 35.9 || 5 || style="background:#FF66FF;"|45.3 || style="background:#FF66FF;"|6 || 28.5 || 3 || 28.7 || 4 || 34.4 || 4 || style="background:#FF66FF;"|49.1 || style="background:#FF66FF;"|6  || style="background:#FF66FF;"|47.2 || style="background:#FF66FF;"|6 || style="background:#FF66FF;"|41.3 || style="background:#FF66FF;"|5 || style="background:#FF66FF;"|45.4 || style="background:#FF66FF;"|6 || style="background:#FF66FF;"|38.0 || style="background:#FF66FF;"|4 || 29.2 || 3 || 35.3 || 4 || style="background:#FF66FF;"|39.0 || style="background:#FF66FF;"|5 || style="background:#FF66FF;"|45.2 || style="background:#FF66FF;"|6
|-
| align="left"| PSD || 26.7 || 4 || align=center colspan=4 rowspan=2|In AD || 27.8 || 3 || style="background:#FF9900;"|29.5 || style="background:#FF9900;"|4 || style="background:#FF9900;"|50.0 || style="background:#FF9900;"|6 || style="background:#FF9900;"|49.9 || style="background:#FF9900;"|6 || 34.5 || 4 || 35.2|| 4 || 41.0 || 5 || 31.9 || 4 || 30.6 || 4 || style="background:#FF9900;"|40.1 || style="background:#FF9900;"|5 || align=center colspan=2 rowspan=2|In PàF || 26.6 || 3 || 29.1 || 3
|-
| align="left"| CDS-PP || 12.5 || 1 || 10.2 || 1 || 8.6 || 1 || 4.5 ||  || 3.5 ||  || 7.1 ||  || 6.0 ||  || 6.7 ||  || 5.5 ||  || 8.8 || 1 || 9.9 || 1 || 3.5 ||  || 1.5 || 
|-
| align="left"| PCP/APU/CDU || 7.3 || 1 || 11.2 || 1 || 9.9 || 1 || 10.7 || 1 || 10.1 || 1 || 7.2 || 1 || 5.0 ||  || 5.1 ||  || 6.1 ||  || 5.1 ||  || 5.5 ||  || 5.7 ||  || 6.2 ||  || 7.0 ||  || 5.6 ||  || 3.4 || 
|-
| align="left"| AD || colspan=2| || style="background:#00FFFF;"|44.8 || style="background:#00FFFF;"|6 || style="background:#00FFFF;"|46.1 || style="background:#00FFFF;"|6 || colspan=26|
|-
| align="left"| PRD || colspan=8| || 16.9 || 2 || 3.5 ||  || colspan=20|
|-
| align="left"| BE || colspan=16| || 2.0 ||  || 2.4 ||  || 6.3 ||  || 10.8 || 1 || 5.8 ||  || 9.9 || 1 || 11.2 || 1 || 5.1
|-
| align="left"| PàF || colspan=26| || style="background:#00AAAA;"|37.2 || style="background:#00AAAA;"|4 || colspan=4|
|-
! Total seats || colspan=6|12 || colspan=6|11 || colspan=12|10 || colspan=8|9
|-
! colspan=33|Source: Comissão Nacional de Eleições
|}

See also
 Villages in the district of Coimbra:
 Casal do Abade
 Coiço

 
Districts of Portugal